A Place in Time is a 2007 American documentary film directed by Angelina Jolie in her directorial debut.

Synopsis

The film takes a look at the daily lives of people in more than two dozen countries around the world during the course of a week.

Cast
 Hazel Armenante
 Nicole Barré
 Anne Hathaway
 Jude Law
 Djimon Hounsou
 Wyclef Jean
 Hilary Swank
 Angelina Jolie
 Bai Ling
 Olivier Martinez
 Jonny Lee Miller

Production
 It was Jolie's directorial debut.

Release
On Friday, April 27, 2007, Jolie, Wyclef Jean, Jude Law, Hilary Swank, and others involved in the film debuted it at New York City's Tribeca Film Festival. The audience included over 600 New York high-school students. It was distributed through the National Education Association.

References

External links
 
 Trailer

2007 films
2007 documentary films
Films directed by Angelina Jolie
American documentary films
2007 directorial debut films
2000s English-language films
2000s American films